Seeweidsee is a lake in the municipality of Hombrechtikon, in the Canton of Zurich, Switzerland. Lake has grass floating mat at it shores.

References

External links
 

Hombrechtikon
Lakes of the canton of Zürich